Susan Johnson (born 1956) is an Australian author of literary fiction, memoir, short stories and essays. She has been a full-time writer since 1985, with occasional stints of journalism at Australian newspapers, journals and magazines.

Biography 
Johnson was born in 1956, in Brisbane, Queensland. She spent her childhood in Sydney, attending St Ives High School In New South Wales and then Nambour High School and Clayfield College in Queensland. She is currently Adjunct Professor of Creative Writing, Queensland University of Technology. Her latest novel The Landing was published in August, 2015.

At the National Library of Australia Johnson delivered the 2011 Ray Mathew Lecture entitled "Prodigal Daughter", in which she explored the topic of expatriate Australian women authors, her ambivalent relationship to Australia, and Australia's attitude towards its artists.

Susan Johnson was on the program to appear in 3 events at the 2017 Brisbane Writers Festival in Brisbane, Queensland, Australia.

Published works 
 Latitudes: New Writing From The North, University of Queensland Press, 1986. 
 Messages from Chaos Harper and Row, 1987. 
 Flying Lessons, Heinemann 1990. 
 A Big Life, MacMillan, 1993. 
 Women Love Sex, Vintage, 1996. 
 A Better Woman: A Memoir Random House, 1999. 
 The Broken Book, Allan & Unwin, 2005. 
 Life in Seven Mistakes, Heinemann, 2008. 
 On Beauty, Melbourne University Press, 2009. 
 My Hundred Lovers, Allen & Unwin, 2012. 
 The Landing, Allen & Unwin, 2015. 
From Where I Fell, Allen & Unwin, 2021.

Contributed chapter 
 "Outside manners", pp. 206–215, in: Destroying the joint, edited by Jane Caro, Read How You Want (2015).

Honors and awards 
 1985: Australia Council Literature Board New Writers Grant
 1989: Nancy Keesing Fellowship at Cite Internationale des Arts in Paris.

References

External links 
 
 Pandora (Australia's Web Archive, archiving Susan Johnson's 'A Better Woman' blog as one of significance
 http://catalogue.nla.gov.au/Search/Home?lookfor=author:%22Johnson%2C%20Susan%2C%201956-%22&iknowwhatimean=1

20th-century Australian novelists
21st-century Australian novelists
Australian non-fiction writers
Australian women short story writers
Australian women novelists
Living people
1956 births
20th-century Australian women writers
21st-century Australian women writers
20th-century Australian short story writers
21st-century Australian short story writers